Christopher Taylor (born August 29, 1981) is an American multi-instrumentalist and record producer. He is best known as the bass guitarist, backing vocalist and producer of the Brooklyn-based indie rock band Grizzly Bear, with whom he has recorded four studio albums. Taylor also records solo material under the moniker CANT, releasing his debut album, Dreams Come True, in 2011.

Acting as Grizzly Bear's regular producer, Taylor has also produced albums for Dirty Projectors, Department of Eagles, Miles Benjamin Anthony Robinson, Twin Shadow, Kishi Bashi and The Morning Benders.

He goes by the nickname 425 when online.

Biography
Born in Seattle, Washington, United States, Taylor is a 2004 graduate of New York University, and once worked in a coffee shop with TV on the Radio members Kyp Malone and David Sitek.

He joined Grizzly Bear following their first release, Horn of Plenty (2004). His contributions to the band's sound since then have varied, and he has become the band's producer since their second album, Yellow House (2006). In live performances, Taylor frequently switches between playing the bass, clarinet, flute, saxophone and sometimes the accordion. He also contributes vocals on most songs.

CANT and Terrible Records
In mid-2009 Taylor founded Terrible Records with label partner Ethan Silverman. He has also released his own solo material which (under the moniker CANT) on the label. His debut solo album, Dreams Come True, was released September 13, 2011.

Discography 
 Arthur Russell - Love is Overtaking Me - mixing, editing and restoration
 Canon Blue - Colonies - mastering
 Department of Eagles - In Ear Park - co-producer, electric bass, flute, woodwinds, effects
 Dirty Projectors - Rise Above - co-producer
 Grizzly Bear - Yellow House - producer, bass guitar, vocals, clarinet, flute, saxophone, electronics and treatments
 Grizzly Bear - Friend EP - producer, vocals
 Grizzly Bear - Veckatimest - producer, bass guitar, vocals
 Grizzly Bear - Shields - producer, vocals, bass, synths, saxophones, clarinet, bass clarinet, flutes, drum machine, the wheel
 Grizzly Bear - Painted Ruins 
 Miles Benjamin Anthony Robinson - Self-titled - producer
 CANT - Dreams Come True - vocals, instrumentation, producer
 CANT/Arthur Russell - Split 7" - producer
 Acrylics - All of the Fire EP - producer
 Liima - 1982 - producer
 The Morning Benders - Big Echo - producer
 Nat Baldwin - Most Valuable Player - producer
 TV on the Radio - Return to Cookie Mountain - horns, clarinet
 Twin Shadow - Forget - producer
 Kishi Bashi - Sonderlust - producer
 Empress Of - Systems'' - producer

References

1981 births
Living people
American rock bass guitarists
American clarinetists
American rock songwriters
American rock singers
American indie pop musicians
Musicians from Seattle
New York University alumni
Warp (record label) artists
Singer-songwriters from Washington (state)
Guitarists from Washington (state)
American male bass guitarists
21st-century American male singers
21st-century American singers
21st-century American bass guitarists
21st-century clarinetists
Grizzly Bear (band) members
American male singer-songwriters